Filip Rubensson, formerly Stenström (born 3 July 1991) is a Swedish former footballer. He played as a defender.

Club career

Malmö FF
Stenström made his Allsvenskan debut in a match against IFK Norrköping on 3 July 2011.

Career statistics
As of 7 August 2013.

References

External links
 
 

1991 births
Living people
Swedish footballers
Sweden youth international footballers
Malmö FF players
IF Limhamn Bunkeflo (men) players
Ängelholms FF players
Allsvenskan players
Superettan players
Ettan Fotboll players
Association football defenders